Adventures in the Underground Journey to the Stars is the third album by English band South, released in 2006. The two singles were A Place in Displacement and Up Close And Personal.

Track listing
 "Shallow"
 "Habit of a Lifetime"
 "You Are One"
 "Pieces of a Dream"
 "Know Yourself"
 "A Place in Displacement"
 "Safety in Numbers"
 "What Holds Us"
 "Up Close and Personal"
 "Meant to Mean"
 "Flesh and Bone"

References

2006 albums
South (band) albums